Albert Guinchard (10 November 1914 – 19 May 1971) was a Swiss footballer who played for Switzerland in the FIFA World Cup in 1934 and 1938. He also played for Servette FC.

References

1914 births
1971 deaths
Swiss men's footballers
Switzerland international footballers
1934 FIFA World Cup players
1938 FIFA World Cup players
Association football midfielders
Servette FC players
Swiss football managers
Servette FC managers